Full Nelson Reilly is the fourth album by Didjits, released on April 19, 1991 through Touch and Go Records. It was the last album to feature Brad Sims on the drums, and the first to feature Steve Albini as producer.

The track "Headless" was originally featured on the EP Fuck the Pigs in 1990.

Track listing

Personnel 
Didjits
Doug Evans – bass guitar
Brad Sims – drums
Rick Sims – vocals, guitar
Production and additional personnel
Steve Albini – production
David Landis – cover art, design

References

External links 
 

1991 albums
Albums produced by Steve Albini
The Didjits albums
Touch and Go Records albums